The Brusilov Nunataks are a group of nunataks lying  north of Mount Morrison in the Tula Mountains, Enderby Land. The geology of the nunataks was investigated by the Soviet Antarctic Expedition, 1961–62, which named them after the Russian polar explorer G.L. Brusilov.

References 

Nunataks of Enderby Land